Suicidal Final Art is a 2001 compilation album by Swedish melodic death metal band At the Gates. The name is taken from a line in the title track of the Slaughter of the Soul album.

Track listing

Credits
Anders Björler - guitar
Jonas Björler - bass
Adrian Erlandsson - drums
Alf Svensson - guitars
Martin Larsson - guitars
Tomas Lindberg - vocals

References

At the Gates albums
2001 compilation albums
Albums produced by Fredrik Nordström